In rare cases, a company that started in one industry may, due to bankruptcy or a change in market conditions, re-emerge with the same name but in a completely different industry. The following companies are notable examples.

Berkshire Hathaway from textile manufacturing to diversified holdings
Coleco from leather supplies to electronics manufacturing
Hudson's Bay Company from the fur trade to retail
ITT Corporation from telecommunications to engineering and manufacturing
Nintendo from playing cards to video games
Nokia from paper and cardboard products, to rubber tires, industrial rubber parts, raincoat and footwear, and then to mobile telephone manufacturing
Reading Company from rail transport to movie theaters
Tandy Corporation from leather supplies to electronics retail
WPP Group from manufacture of wire baskets to advertising
Zapata Corporation from energy exploration to fish protein

Switched